Old Fort is an unincorporated community in Polk County, Tennessee, United States. Oldfort has a post office with ZIP code 37362.

References

Unincorporated communities in Polk County, Tennessee
Unincorporated communities in Tennessee